A vocalise is a vocal work or an exercise without words.

Vocalise may also refer to:

 Vocalise (Corigliano), a 1999 orchestral composition by John Corigliano
 "Vocalise" (Rachmaninoff), a 1915 song by Sergei Rachmaninoff
 Adiemus V: Vocalise, a 2003 album by Karl Jenkins

See also
 Vocalese
 Vocalisation (disambiguation)